Volambita is a commune in Madagascar. It belongs to the district of Iakora, which is a part of Ihorombe Region. The population of the commune was 5,617 in 2018.

References

Populated places in Ihorombe